Kollaikaran is a 2012 Tamil-language film directed by Tamil Selvan. The film, starring Vidharth and Sanchita Shetty, was released on 13 January 2012.

Plot 
It is a story of a man named Kuruvi (Vidharth), who commits small crimes. He falls in love with a girl named Krishnaveni (Sanchita Shetty) who, on finding him to be a criminal, rejects his proposal. Kuruvi's elder sister marries Krishnaveni's relative and they become close again. Kuruvi is falsely accused of stealing the temple's jewels. He eventually kills the jewel thief and goes to jail. The movie ends with Kuruvi back in the same temple and Krishnaveni asking him to come home.

Cast 
Vidharth as Kuruvi
Sanchita Shetty as Krishnaveni
Ravi Shankar as Nagendran
Crane Manohar
Senthi Kumari as Kuruvi's sister

Critical response 
Rohit Ramachandran of Now Running rated Kollaikaran 1.5/5 calling it "a staple product from hack-haven Kollywood". Sify wrote "The story may be old fashioned and remind you of 70-80?s film, but the way it has been packaged with its unexpected twists and turns is what makes it tick". Behindwoods wrote "Kollaikaran manages to make a decent mark mainly because of the screenplay by director Thamizh Selvan which gets its characterisation right."

Soundtrack 

The film score and the soundtrack were composed by Johan Shevanesh.

References 

2012 films
2010s Tamil-language films
Indian action comedy films
2012 directorial debut films
2012 action comedy films